Simeon Borisov von Saxe-Coburg-Gotha (born 16 June 1937) is a Bulgarian politician who reigned as the last tsar of the Kingdom of Bulgaria as Simeon II from 1943 until 1946. He was six years old when his father Boris III of Bulgaria died in 1943 and royal power was exercised on his behalf by a regency led by Simeon's uncle Kiril, Prince of Preslav, General Nikola Mihov and prime minister, Bogdan Filov. In 1946 the monarchy was abolished by referendum, and Simeon was forced into exile. 

He returned to his home country in 1996, formed the political party National Movement for Stability and Progress (NMSP) and was elected Prime Minister of the Republic of Bulgaria from July 2001 until August 2005. In the next elections, as a leader of NMSP, he took part in a coalition government with the Bulgarian Socialist Party. In 2009, after NMSP failed to win any seats in Parliament, he left politics.

He is, along with the current Dalai Lama, one of only two living people who were heads of state during World War II.

Royal history 

Simeon was born to Boris III of Bulgaria and Giovanna of Italy. Following his birth, Boris III sent an air force officer to the Jordan River to obtain water for Simeon's baptism in the Orthodox faith. He was pointed to accede to the throne on 28 August 1943 upon the death of his father, who had just returned to Bulgaria from a meeting with Adolf Hitler. Then a massive media campaign was launched throughout Bulgaria in the name of the Tsar to uphold the national spirit during heavy War-times. Since Simeon was only six years old, his uncle Prince Kiril, Prime Minister Bogdan Filov, and Lt. General Nikola Mihov of the Bulgarian Army were appointed regents.

Under his father, Bulgaria had reluctantly joined the Axis powers in World War II but had managed to preserve diplomatic relations with the Soviet Union. Still, on 5 September 1944 Stalin declared war on Bulgaria and three days later, the Red Army entered the country without encountering resistance. On the next day, 9 September 1944, Prince Kyril and the other regents were deposed by a Soviet-backed coup and arrested. The three regents, all members of the last three governments, Parliament deputies, heads of the army and eminent journalists were executed by the Communists in February 1945.

Towards exile 
The royal family—Queen Giovanna, Simeon, and his sister Maria-Louisa—remained at Vrana Palace near Sofia, while three new regents were appointed, all Communists (Todor Pavlov, Venelin Ganev and Tsvetko Boboshevski). On 15 September 1946, a referendum was held in the presence of the Soviet army. It resulted in a 95.6% approval for republic and abolition of the monarchy. This referendum actually violated the Tarnovo Constitution, which held that any change in the form of the state could only be implemented by a Grand National Assembly convened by the tsar.

On 16 September 1946, the royal family was exiled from Bulgaria while given a way to take out large amount of movable property along with the train composition. They first went to Alexandria, Egypt, where Queen Giovanna's father Victor Emmanuel III, the former king of Italy, lived in exile. There, in 1951 Simeon studied at Victoria College (along with Crown Prince Leka of Albania). In July 1951, General Francisco Franco's dictatorship in Spain granted asylum to the family.

Education and business career 
In Madrid, Simeon studied at the Lycée Français. On 16 June 1955, upon turning 18, in accordance with the Tarnovo Constitution Simeon read a proclamation to the Bulgarian people, claiming he is Tsar of Bulgaria, confirming his will to be Tsar of all Bulgarians and to follow the principles contrary to then ruled by communist regime Bulgaria. In 1958, he enrolled at Valley Forge Military Academy and College in the United States, where he was known as "Cadet Rylski No. 6883", and graduated as a second lieutenant. Once again in Spain (between 1959 and 1962), Simeon studied law and business administration.

He became a businessman. For thirteen years, he was chairman of the Spanish subsidiary of Thomson, a French defense and electronics group. He was also an adviser in the banking, hotel, electronics, and catering sectors.

Marriage and issue 
On 21 January 1962, Simeon married a Spanish aristocrat, Doña Margarita Gómez-Acebo y Cejuela. The couple have had five children – four sons (Kardam, Kiril, Kubrat and Konstantin) and a daughter, Kalina, all of whom subsequently married Spaniards. All of his sons received names of Bulgarian Tsars, his daughter has a Bulgarian name, although only four of his eleven grandchildren have Bulgarian names (Boris, Sofia, Mirko and Simeon).
 Kardam (1962–2015) married Miriam Ungría y López. They had two sons, Boris and Beltran.
 Kiril (born 1964) married María del Rosario Nadal y Fuster de Puigdórfila. They have two daughters, Mafalda and Olimpia, and one son, Tassilo.
 Kubrat (born 1965) married Carla María de la Soledad Royo-Villanova y Urrestarazu. They have three sons: Mirko, Lukás and Tirso.
 Konstantin-Assen (born 1967) married María García de la Rasilla y Gortázar. They have twins, Umberto and Sofia.
 Kalina (born 1972) married Antonio José "Kitín" Muñoz y Valcárcel. They have one son, Simeon Hassan Muñoz.

Political return 
In 1990, just months after the fall of communism, Simeon was issued a new Bulgarian passport. In 1996, fifty years after the abolition of the monarchy, Simeon returned to Bulgaria and was met in many places by crowds of approval. He did not, at that point, make any political announcements or moves, as he had already denied in a TV interview (1990) to have any material property claims against Bulgaria. However, these social sentiments gradually disappeared after his premiership, with Simeon making moves to take back large areas or real estate property in Bulgaria that was under the monarchy's governance before 1945.

In 2001, Simeon, who had by this time taken the name Simeon Borisov Saxe-Coburg-Gotha, announced he would return to Bulgaria to form a new political party, the National Movement Simeon II (later renamed to NMSP), dedicated to "reforms and political integrity." Simeon promised that in 800 days the Bulgarian people would feel tangible positive effects of his government and would enjoy significantly higher standards of living.

Prime Minister 

NMSP won a large victory in the parliamentary elections held on 17 June 2001, capturing 120 of the 240 seats in Parliament and defeating the two main pre-existing political parties. Simeon gave an oath as Prime Minister of Republic of Bulgaria on 24 July, forming a coalition with the ethnic Turkish party, Movement for Rights and Freedoms (MRF). He gave ministerial positions in his government mainly to technocrats and Western-educated economic specialists.

During his time in power, Bulgaria joined NATO, after he had agreed to enter into the US-led coalition against Iraq. In 2002, he received the Path to Peace Award from the Path to Peace Foundation.

In the 2005 elections, Simeon's party ranked second and participated in the grand coalition government led by the Bulgarian Socialist Party and including the Movement for Rights and Freedoms. Simeon was given the unofficial ceremonial post of Chairman of the Coalition Council.

The party got just 3.01% of votes and no seats at the parliamentary elections of 2009. Shortly after, on 6 July, Simeon also resigned as NMSP leader.

Views on restoration of the Bulgarian monarchy 
Although not yet formally renouncing his claim to the Bulgarian throne, Simeon and his family take part in long orchestrated media campaigns and moves throughout Bulgarian political space. He used the title "Tsar of the Bulgarians" in his political statements during his exile. Since his return to Bulgaria, however, Simeon has consistently avoided revealing his views on the restoration of the Bulgarian monarchy, notwithstanding the original name of his party.

Autobiography 
Simeon wrote an autobiography in French under the title Simeon II de Bulgarie, un destin singulier that was released in Bulgaria on 28 October 2014. It was first presented at the headquarters of the UNESCO in Paris on 22 October 2014.

Titles and styles
15 September 1946 – present: His Majesty Tsar Simeon II of the Bulgarians (title of pretense and by courtesy)
24 July 2001 – present: Simeon Saxe-Coburg-Gotha

In a statement published on its website on 1 May 2015, the Bulgarian Patriarchate announced that Simeon Saxe-Coburg-Gotha will be referred to as Tsar of Bulgaria in all public and private services held in the dioceses of the Bulgarian Orthodox Church.

Dynastic honours 
  House of Saxe-Coburg-Gotha-Koháry: Knight and Grand Master of the Order of Saints Cyril and Methodius
  House of Saxe-Coburg-Gotha-Koháry: Grand Master of the Royal Order of Saint Alexander
  House of Saxe-Coburg-Gotha-Koháry: Grand Master of the Royal Order of Bravery
  House of Saxe-Coburg-Gotha-Koháry: Grand Master of the Royal Order of Civil Merit
  House of Saxe-Coburg-Gotha-Koháry: Grand Master of the Royal Order of Military Merit
  House of Saxe-Coburg-Gotha-Koháry: Recipient of the Coming of age Medal of Tsar Simeon II

National state honours 
 : Grand Cross of the Order of Stara Planina
  Bulgarian Ministry of Defence: Collar of the Order of Justice

Foreign state and dynastic honours 
 : Grand Cross of the Order of Leopold II
 : Grand'Croix of the Order of the Legion of Honour
  Orléans-French Royal Family: Knight Grand Cross of the Order of Saint Lazarus
  Greek Royal Family: Knight Grand Cross of the Royal Order of the Redeemer
  Italian Royal Family: Knight of the Supreme Order of the Most Holy Annunciation
 : Knight Grand Cross of the Order of the Holy Sepulchre
 : Bailiff Knight Grand Cross of Honour and Devotion of the Sovereign Military Order of Malta
  Two Sicilian Royal Family:
 Knight of the Royal Order of Saint Januarius
 Bailiff Knight Grand Cross of the Two Sicilian Royal Sacred Military Order of Saint George
 : Grand Cordon of the Order of Independence
 : Knight Grand Cordon with Collar of the Order of Palestine
  Portuguese Royal Family: Knight Grand Cross of the Order of the Immaculate Conception of Vila Viçosa
  Russian Imperial Family: Knight of the Imperial Order of Saint Andrew
 :
 Knight Grand Cross of the Order of Charles III
 Knight of the Order of the Golden Fleece

National awards 
 : Honorary degree of the National Guards Unit of Bulgaria
 : Jubilee badge of honour of the Bulgarian Chitalishte community

Foreign awards 
 : Paneuropean Union integration award
 : Honorary degree of the University of Bucharest
 : Adoptive Son of Madrid

Arms

Patronages

National patronages 
 : Patron of the National day of Bulgaria

Foreign patronages 
 : Patron of restoration of the Statue of St. John of Nepomuk in Divina, realised out under auspices of the Embassy of the Federal Republic of Germany in Slovakia (2017).

Ancestry

See also 
 The Boy Who Was a King, a 2011 Bulgarian documentary by Andrey Paounov.
 House of Saxe-Coburg and Gotha

References

Bibliography 
 Ramon Perez-Maura, El rey possible: Simeon de Bulgaria, Belacqua, Madrid, 2002
 Simeon II de Bulgarie, Sébastien de Courtois, Un destin singulier, Flammarion, 2014

Books 
In addition to the books listed in the References, the following may be mentioned:
 Walter J.R. Curley, Monarchs in Waiting. London: Hutchinson & Co., 1975. (pp. 23–25: "Bulgaria: His Majesty King Simeon II")
 Pashanko Dimitroff, Boris III of Bulgaria 1894–1943. London, 1986. 
 Charles Fenyvesi, Royalty in Exile. London: Robson Books, 1981. (pp. 153–171: "Czar Simeon of the Bulgars") 
 Stephane Groueff Crown of Thorns, Lanham MD. and London, 1987. 
 Gregory Lauder-Frost, The Betrayal of Bulgaria, Monarchist League Policy Paper, London, 1989.
 Robert K. Massie and Jeffrey Firestone, The Last Courts of Europe. New York: Greenwich House, 1983.

Articles 
 The Daily Telegraph, Obituary for "HM Queen Ioanna of the Bulgarians", London, 28 February 2000.

External links 

 King Simeon II – Personal website
 The first website about Simeon II of Bulgaria focuses on his pre-1995 history
 Saxe-Coburg-Gotha's statement, 5 July 2002 concerning Bulgaria's candidacy for NATO membership: "The role of the international community should be gradually transformed from crisis response to integration. Palliative measures intended to mitigate yet another crisis cannot bring stability and prosperity. The best solution is the region's integration into the European and Euroatlantic institutions."
 Saxe-Coburg-Gotha's address, 10 February 2005 concerning amending the constitution to bring it in line with EU requirements, Standart

1937 births
20th-century Bulgarian monarchs
Simeon
Leaders ousted by a coup
Living people
Modern child monarchs
Eastern Orthodox monarchs
Politicians from Sofia
Child pretenders
Prime Ministers of Bulgaria
Monarchs deposed as children
Victoria College, Alexandria alumni
Valley Forge Military Academy and College alumni
World War II political leaders

Grand Master of the Order of Military Merit (Bulgaria)
Recipients of the Order of Bravery
Grand Crosses of the Order of the Crown (Belgium)
Recipients of the Grand Cross of the Order of Leopold II
Grand Cordons of the Order of Independence (Jordan)
Knights of the Holy Sepulchre
Bailiffs Grand Cross of Honour and Devotion of the Sovereign Military Order of Malta
Recipients of the Order of Saint Lazarus (statuted 1910)
Grand Officiers of the Légion d'honneur
Knights of the Golden Fleece of Spain
Knights Grand Cross of the Order of the Immaculate Conception of Vila Viçosa
Nobility from Sofia